Phlox divaricata, the wild blue phlox, woodland phlox, or wild sweet william, is a species of flowering plant in the family Polemoniaceae, native to forests and fields in eastern North America.

Etymology 
The species name divaricata means "with a spreading and straggling habit".

Description 
Flowers appear in late spring and early summer. The petals are a variety of pastel colors: blue-lavender, light purple, pink, or white. Flowers bloom March to May. It grows in moist, deciduous woods and bluffs.

There are two subspecies: ssp. divaricata, with petals notched at the tip, and ssp. laphamii, without a notch.

Ecology 
The flowers produce nectar at the base of the long, narrow corolla tube, and pollen near the end of the corolla tube. Only butterflies, moths, skippers, and long-tongued bees have long enough tongues to drink the nectar. Short-tongued bees and flower flies are unable to reach the nectar, but may gather or feed on pollen.

Phlox is self-incompatible, so it requires cross-pollination to produce seed. Butterflies are the most effective pollinators. As they insert their proboscis into the flower to drink nectar, it contacts the anthers and picks up pollen. As they coil the proboscis before moving to the next flower, most of the pollen falls off, but some remains to be transferred to the stigma of the next flower that they drink nectar from.

Cultivation 
Cultivated varieties have various colours, including blue ('Blue Moon'), lavender ('Clouds of Perfume') and white ('Fuller's White', 'White Perfume'). 

Phlox divaricata and the lavender-flowered cultivar 'Chattahoochee' have both won the Royal Horticultural Society's Award of Garden Merit.

Gallery

References

External links 

 
 
Connecticut Botanical Society
Kansas Wildflowers and Grasses
Missouri Plants
Virginia Tech Weed Identification Guide
BioImages
Missouri Botanical Garden
IPNI Listing

divaricata
Perennial plants
Plants described in 1753
Taxa named by Carl Linnaeus
Flora of the North-Central United States
Flora of the Northeastern United States
Flora of the South-Central United States
Flora of the Southeastern United States